Bibi Bhani (Gurmukhi: ਬੀਬੀ ਭਾਨੀ; January 19, 1535 – April 9, 1598), also known as Mata Bhani (Gurmukhi: ਮਾਤਾ ਭਾਨੀ), was the daughter of Guru Amar Das, the third Sikh Guru. She played a central role in the history of Sikhism.

Biography 

Bibi Bhani was born to Guru Amar Das and Mata Mansa Devi on 19 January 1535 in Basarke Gillan, a village near Amritsar. Her older sister was Bibi Dani and two brothers were Bhai Mohan and Bhai Mohri.

On 18 February 1554 she married Bhai Jetha (whose name was later changed to Guru Ram Das), a Sodhi Khatri from Lahore. Bhai Jetha later moved to Goindval, a Sikh town, and carried out voluntary service (sewa) in the construction of Baoli Sahib (sacred well). They had three sons: Prithi Chand, Maha Dev, and Arjan Dev. She kept serving her father after her marriage, as her in-laws were local.

As the completion of the Gurdwara at Goindval neared, Guru Amar Das charged Bhai Jetha with the task of establishing a new Sikh center at a location that first was known as Ramdasar. Noticing that the waters of the pond were said to have "curative" powers, Bhai Jetha expanded the pond into a sarovar that he named Amritsar. It was in the center of this "Lake of Amrit" that the construction of the Harmandar Sahib was begun. The modern city of Amritsar took its name from Bhai Jetha's sarovar.

According to one version of accounts, the land that was used for the building of Ramdaspur was bestowed upon her as a donation by Mughal emperor Akbar during his visit to Guru Amar Das.

She is said to have served her father devoutly. One story involves her seeing Guru Amar Das meditating on a wooden seat. She noticed one of the legs of the seat were about to break so she used her hands to keep the seat upright to prevent the Guru from falling. After the Guru finished meditating, he noticed her hand was bleeding from holding the seat upright. After witnessing this, the Guru told her that her offspring will inherit the guruship.

Bibi Bhani died in Goindval on 9 April 1598.

See also 
 Guru Amar Das
 Guru Ram Das
 Guru Arjan

References

Sources 

 Copyright © Harbans Singh "The encyclopedia of Sikhism. Vol III." pages 1 – 4
 Bhalla, Sarup Das, Mahima Prakash. Patiala, 1971
 Chhibbar, Kesar Singh, Bansavalinama Dasan Patshahiali Ka. Chandigarh, 1972
 Gian Singh, Giani, Twarikh Curu Khalsa. Patiala, 1970

Family members of the Sikh gurus
1535 births
1598 deaths
Punjabi people